GBK may refer to:

Sport 
 GBK Kokkola, a Finnish football club
 Gentofte BK, a Danish badminton club
 Gråå BK, a Swedish volleyball club

Other uses 
 GBK (character encoding)
 Gabon Airlines
 Gbangbatok Airport, in Sierra Leone
 Gelora Bung Karno Stadium, an Indonesian sport stadium
 Gourmet Burger Kitchen, a British restaurant chain
 Grand Belial's Key, an American National Socialist black metal band
 Gulf Bank of Kuwait
 Mandeali language